Choi Suk-jae (born November 7, 1966) is a male South Korean former handball player who competed in the 1988 Summer Olympics and in the 1992 Summer Olympics.

In 1988 he won the silver medal with the South Korean team. He played all six matches as goalkeeper.

Four years later he finished sixth with the South Korean team in the 1992 Olympic tournament. He played all six matches as goalkeeper again.

External links

1966 births
Living people
South Korean male handball players
Olympic handball players of South Korea
Handball players at the 1988 Summer Olympics
Handball players at the 1992 Summer Olympics
Olympic silver medalists for South Korea
Olympic medalists in handball
Korea National Sport University alumni
Asian Games medalists in handball
Handball players at the 1990 Asian Games
Medalists at the 1988 Summer Olympics
Asian Games gold medalists for South Korea
Medalists at the 1990 Asian Games
20th-century South Korean people